Deception is the hiding or distorting of the truth.

Deception or The Deception may also refer to:
 Deception (criminal law), a legal term

Places
 Deception Glacier, Antarctica
 Deception Island, Antarctica
 Deception Plateau, Antarctica
 Deception River, New Zealand
 Deception Pass, Washington, U.S.

Film
 The Deception (film), a 1909 film directed by D. W. Griffith
 Deception (1920 film) or Anna Boleyn, a film starring Emil Jennings and Henny Porten
 Deception (1932 film), an American Pre-Code sports drama
 Deception (1946 film), a film noir starring Bette Davis, Paul Henreid and Claude Rains
 Deception (1975 film) or End of the Game, a German thriller
 Deceptions, a 1990 drama starring Nicollette Sheridan and Harry Hamlin
 Deception (1992 film) or Ruby Cairo, starring Liam Neeson
 Deception (2000 film) or Reindeer Games, a film starring Ben Affleck
 Deception (2003 film), a film starring Debi Mazar
 Deception (2004 film), a film starring Dina Meyer
 Deception (2008 film), a film starring Hugh Jackman and Ewan McGregor
 Deception (2013 Australian/Canadian film) or Absolute Deception, a film starring Cuba Gooding Jr
 Deception (2013 Italian film) or The Best Offer, a film starring Geoffrey Rush, Jim Sturgess, Sylvia Hoeks and Donald Sutherland

Television
 "Deception" (House), the ninth episode of the second season of House

Series
 Deception (2013 American TV series), prime time soap opera
 Deception (2018 TV series), American crime procedural drama
 Deception (Irish TV series), prime time television drama airing on TV3
 Deception (Ugandan TV series), Ugandan drama

Games
 Deception (video game series), a series of PlayStation games
 Tecmo's Deception: Invitation to Darkness or simply Deception, the first game in the series
 Mortal Kombat: Deception, a 2004 game in the Mortal Kombat series
 Deception (board game), a 2015 detective game

Books
 Deception (novel), a novel by Philip Roth
 The Deception (Animorphs), a novel by K.A. Applegate
 Jedi Apprentice: Deceptions, a 2001 Jedi Apprentice novel by Jude Watson
 The Deception, a novel by Catherine Coulter
 The Deception, a novel by Barry Reed
 Deception, a novel by Joan Aiken (U.S. title: If I Were You)
 Deception: Pakistan, the United States, and the Global Nuclear Weapons Conspiracy, a 2007 book by Adrian Levy and Catherine Scott-Clark

Music
 Deception (album), a 1987 album by The Colourfield
 The Deception (album), a 2011 album by The Dogg
 "Deception", a song by Blackalicious from A2G
 "The Deception", a song by I Like Trains from Elegies to Lessons Learnt

See also
 Deception in animals, deception by non-human animals
 Military deception, misleading the enemy during warfare
 Deceit (disambiguation)
 Deceived, a 1991 film starring Goldie Hawn
 Deceiver (disambiguation)
 Decepticon, a race of robots in the Transformers universe
 Deceptive Records, a UK record label